"The Rain" is a 1986 crossover hit single originally performed by R&B singer Oran "Juice" Jones, which he released on and from his debut album Juice.

The song's lyrics involve a man confronting his lover regarding her infidelity. At the end of the track is a long recitation which was written by Vincent Bell, who also composed the music.

Reception 
The single was Jones's biggest hit. It reached number one on the Billboard R&B chart for two weeks, making it the first #1 R&B hit issued by the then newly created Def Jam record label. The single also peaked at #9 on the Billboard Hot 100. Outside the United States, "The Rain" reached #4 on the UK Singles Chart

"The Rain" was nominated for one Grammy Award for Best R&B Vocal Performance, Male, but Jones never had another Hot 100 hit and left the music business after his third album failed to chart. "The Rain" is ranked #63 on VH1's 100 Greatest One-Hit Wonders of the '80s.

Charts

Weekly charts

Year-end charts

Certifications

Production 
The Rain music video featured actress Danita Davis as Jones' girlfriend.

Answer records 
Several answer records were recorded after the success of "The Rain". All were released in 1986. “Thunder & Lightning”, performed by Miss Thang, was released by Tommy Boy Records. "Walkin in the Rain, Yes You Saw Me" by Pamala was released by Evejim Records. "The Drain", recorded by Leot Littlepage, was released on Select Records.

Cover Versions
In 2001, the song was covered by NYC band Si*Sé on their self-titled debut album. 
In 2005, jazz artist Ledisi covered "The Rain" on the album Def Jazz, which featured vocals from Jones.

Samples
The song was sampled for "Standing in the Rain" by Action Bronson and Dan Auerbach of The Black Keys ft Mark Ronson featured in the 2016 film Suicide Squad.

In popular culture
The song was featured in a late 1986 episode of the US daytime soap opera General Hospital.
In 2018, Donald Glover parodied the song in a Saturday Night Live sketch written by and co-starring cast member Cecily Strong and also featuring Kenan Thompson. Glover played "Raz P. Berry," singing "The Night (I Watched You)." Instead of ending with the usual string of threats and revenge, the whole song turns out to be a disastrous case of mistaken identity.

References

1986 singles
1986 songs
Def Jam Recordings singles
Songs about infidelity